Learners may refer to:

 Learners, those humans, animals, and artificial cognitive systems which participate in acquiring knowledge
 Learners, a British comedy drama television film starring David Tennant and Jessica Hynes.
 The Learners Chorus, a Hong Kong musical group